Below is a list of schools that offer virtual or online education programs and are accredited by an accrediting body recognized by the US Department of Education. The Distance Education Accrediting Commission is the primary accrediting body that recognizes online schools, but not all schools on this list are accredited by that agency. This list includes schools that offer fully online programs exclusively, as well as schools that offer at least one fully online program in addition to campus offerings. During the COVID-19 pandemic, many of the colleges and universities in the United States offered classes entirely online, particularly facilitated via Zoom.

Current

Closed
 Allied American University
 Argosy University
 Ellis University
 California Pacific University
 Everest University
 Green Mountain College
 Heald College
 ICDC College
 Independence University
 International Academy of Design and Technology
 Ivy Bridge College
 Jones International University
 Kaplan University
 McKinley College
 Parks College
 Parker University
 Tennessee Temple University
 University of the Rockies
 Virginia College

References

 
Online colleges
 *